Aequorivita lipolytica  is a bacterium from the genus of Aequorivita which occurs in sea water in the Antarctica.

References

Further reading

External links
Type strain of Aequorivita lipolytica at BacDive -  the Bacterial Diversity Metadatabase	

Flavobacteria
Bacteria described in 2002